Alphone Martell (1890 - 1976) was a French actor who wrote and directed Gigolettes of Paris (1933). He portrayed a director in the 1934 film I'll Be Suing You. He often portrayed a waiter as in the 1946 film Falcon's Alibi, in which he is murdered.

He appeared on TV shows including Climax! and Mission Impossible.

Selected filmography

A Fighting Heart (1924)
After a Million (1924), as Ivan Senine 
 South of the Equator (1924), as General's Aide
The Prairie Wife (1925), as Count de Chateaunois (uncredited) 
Strings of Steel (1926), as Alexander Graham Bell
The Mystery Club (1926), as Sengh 
Gigolo (film) (1926), as Waiter at Maxim's (uncredited) 
Grinning Guns (1927), as Tony the Dude 
Naughty Nanette (1927), as Carlton Mary
 She's My Baby (1927), as Alphonze Dabreau
Dream of Love(1928), as Michonet
The Night Bird (1928), as Pete 
The Divine Sinner (1928), as Paul Coudert 
Possessed (1931), as French Waiter (uncredited)
Cocktail Hour (film) (1933), as French Butler (uncredited) 
Maid in Hollywood (1934)
I'll Be Suing You (1934), as Director
 The Widow from Monte Carlo (1935)
Manhattan Butterfly (1935)
 The Great Hotel Murder (1935)
We Have Our Moments (1937), as Headwaiter
Suez (film) (1938), as General St. Arnaud
For Love or Money (1939), as Head Waiter  
Give Out, Sisters (1942), as Headwaiter
Enter Arsène Lupin (1944), as Conductor 
Pardon My Rhythm (1944), as Headwaiter
Meet Miss Bobby Socks (1944), as Headwaiter (uncredited)  
Dick Tracy (1945), as Jules
Blonde from Brooklyn (1945), as Maitre'd (uncredited) 
The Catman of Paris (1946), as Maurice
Falcon's Alibi (1946)
The Crime Doctor's Gamble (1947), as Institute Superintendent 
French Leave (1948 film), as Waiter 
''The Story of Will Rogers (1952), as French Premier (uncredited)

References

French male television actors
20th-century French male actors
French male film actors
1890 births
1976 deaths